Transport in Sydney is provided by an extensive network of public transport operating modes including metro, train, bus, ferry and light rail, as well as an expansive network of roadways, cycleways and airports. According to the 2006 census, in terms of travel to work or study Sydney has the highest rate of public transport usage among the Australian capital cities of 26.3% with more than 80% of weekday trips to/from Central Sydney being made by public transport. According to the New South Wales State Plan, the state has Australia's largest public transport system. The public transport network is regulated by Transport for NSW.

History

Sydney's early urban sprawl can be traced in part to the development of its passenger rail network as well as the availability of the automobile as the dominant mode of transport–a similar history has shaped the transport and infrastructure of most major Australian cities. The first rail services began in 1855, 67 years after the settlement's foundation and a tram network which began in 1861, becoming the Southern Hemisphere's largest by the 1920s. This rail infrastructure allowed working-class suburbs to develop at a large distance from the city centre. In terms of effectiveness and sustainability of public transport, Sydney lagged behind Brisbane and many other cities in a 2017 study by design firm Arcadis, where it was ranked at 51.

Ticketing

Transport for NSW public transport services use the Opal ticketing system. The rollout of this contactless system started in December 2012 and completed in December 2014. The previous generation of ticketing products were withdrawn in August 2016.
Fares are controlled by the Independent Pricing and Regulatory Tribunal of New South Wales. As of January 2009, Sydney public transport prices were slightly higher than in other mainland Australian cities.

Bus

Commuter bus services account for about half of the public transport journeys taken in the city on weekdays. Services are provided by private sector operators under contract to Transport for NSW.

The largest private bus operator is ComfortDelGro Australia, owner of Hillsbus and Forest Coach Lines. Other significant players include Busways, Transdev NSW and Transit Systems

Bus services in the regions surrounding Sydney are considered part of the metropolitan network. Outer-metropolitan services are provided by the private sector under contract to Transport for NSW.  Here, ComfortDelGro Australia, Busways, Premier Illawarra and Newcastle Transport are significant players.

Network
Sydney's bus network has been divided into different regions. Of these regions, bus routes are classified with three-digit route numbers.

Currently, Sydney has two operating T-Ways:
The Liverpool-Parramatta T-way opened in 2003
The North-West T-way opened in 2007

Additional bus networks operate in the Outer Sydney region, which include:
 Blue Mountains
 Newcastle

Rail

Commuter Rail 

Suburban rail services within Sydney are provided by Sydney Trains. Sydney's suburban commuter rail service consists of a complex system of integrated railway lines, of which most run through the city underground. All city trains consist of eight double deck carriages with two crew members on board–driver and guard. Fares are calculated on the basis of distance travelled. Trains run from 4am until around 1am seven days a week with Nightride bus services covering the network throughout the night when trains are not operating.

NSW TrainLink interurban trains operate from Central railway station to the Illawarra, Southern Highlands, Blue Mountains, Central Coast and Newcastle. This station is also the terminus for NSW TrainLink's long-distance trains to numerous destinations in country New South Wales as well as Melbourne and Brisbane. The Indian Pacific also operates to Adelaide and Perth.

Rapid Transit (Metro) 

Sydney Metro is a rapid transit line that opened in 2019 and runs from Sydney's north-western suburbs to its terminus at Chatswood, a major transport interchange. Construction is currently underway for the second phase of the line, where it will eventually pass through the city and then travel south-west to Bankstown. Work is progressing to extend this line from Chatswood to Bankstown, running under Sydney Harbour and the CBD with a scheduled 2024 completion. When completed, this line will have  of twin tracks and 31 stations in total.

Sydney is the first and currently the only Australian city with a fully automated rapid transit metro system. Despite extensive plans for an underground network in the past, disputes over privatisation and funding had hampered government approval, delaying its inception. In spite of difficulties getting the project off the ground, government approval for what was initially known as the North West Rail Link, Sydney's first underground metro, was given in 2013.

Freight 

Freight services operate over most of the suburban railway lines in Sydney, however due to the high frequency of passenger services and the lack of freight only tracks, there is a curfew on freight movements during peak hours.

The major interstate freight routes are the Main Southern and Main North lines, with the Illawarra and Main Western lines serving lineside industries and as alternate interstate routes. In the inner city area the Metropolitan Goods lines connects major freight terminals to the main passenger lines and the Southern Sydney Freight Line which runs parallel to the Main South line from the western end of the Metropolitan Goods lines to a point beyond the end of suburban services. As of 2013, construction of the Northern Sydney Freight Corridor is under way. This is a series of projects along the Main Northern line between Sydney and Newcastle aimed at increasing the number of freight trains operating along the route.

The main traffic is containerised freight. The main intermodal terminals are at Enfield, Moorebank (under construction), Yennora and Minto. Interstate trains to Sydney terminals are up to 1500 metres long, while short-haul container trains from the terminals to the Port Botany seaport are around 600 metres long. Coal services to Port Kembla are another major traffic. Freight operators include Crawfords Freightlines, Southern Shorthaul Railroad, Pacific National, Qube Holdings and SCT Logistics.

Trams and light rail

Sydney once had the Southern Hemisphere's largest tram network. Patronage peaked in 1945 at 405 million passenger journeys. The system was in place from 1861 until its winding down in the 1950s and eventual closure in 1961. It had a maximum street mileage of 291 km (181 miles) in 1923. A short heritage tramway operated by the Sydney Tramway Museum has linked Loftus railway station and the Royal National Park since the 1990s.

In 1997, a short light rail line between Central and Pyrmont opened, now known as the Dulwich Hill Line. The line was extended twice and is now 12.8 km long. A second line, passing through Sydney's CBD from Circular Quay to Randwick and Kingsford opened in stages between December 2019 and April 2020. There is also a planned line running from Westmead station to Carlingford via Parramatta station, reusing part of the old single tracked Carlingford line. The line is due to open in May 2024. A second line is also proposed to branch from Camelia to Strathfield via Sydney Olympic Park. The Parramatta light rail lines will have no connection to the Inner West light rail or the CBD and South East light rail lines.

Punctuality
The punctuality of Sydney's rail network has been highlighted, and an April 2017 news report stated that "The punctuality of intercity trains lags behind suburban trains, and there was an extended period of declining punctuality between 2011 and 2014".

Ferry

Sydney Ferries 

Sydney Ferries runs numerous commuter and tourist ferries on Sydney Harbour and the Parramatta River. Harbour ferries are used in equal measure by commuter and leisure users; Parramatta River ferries are overwhelmingly used for leisure and tourist trips. Sydney Ferries operates nine routes, with approximately 14,000,000 passengers per year. Sydney Ferries operates from Circular Quay Ferry Terminal, a major transport hub in Sydney's central business district, with popular routes including services to the beachside suburb of Manly and to Taronga Zoo, a major tourist attraction. Sydney Ferries also operates sightseeing cruises for tourists.

Other passenger ferry operators 
Several private sector companies run passenger ferries in the Sydney region. These include:
 Church Point Ferry, from Church Point to Scotland Island
 Cronulla and National Park Ferry, from Cronulla to Bundeena
 Dangar Island Ferries, from Brooklyn to Dangar Island
 Captain Cook Cruises, from Circular Quay to Darling Harbour, Lane Cove and hop On/Hop Off loop service to Taronga Zoo, Watsons Bay, etc.
 Palm Beach Ferry, from Palm Beach to Great Mackerel Beach and the Basin, and to Ettalong Beach and Wagstaffe
Palm Beach & Hawkesbury River Cruises, from Palm Beach to Patonga

Vehicle ferries 
Several car ferries form part of Sydney's road system. These ferries are controlled by a combination of the Roads and Maritime Services and local government, and are toll-free. They include:
 Berowra Waters Ferry, across Berowra Creek
 Lower Portland Ferry, across the Hawkesbury River
 Mortlake Ferry, across the Parramatta River
 Webbs Creek Ferry, across the Hawkesbury River
 Wisemans Ferry, across the Hawkesbury River
 Sackville Ferry, across the Hawkesbury River

Roads 

In Sydney, an expansive network of various motorways and roads play a substantial and fundamental role, spurred by a high reliance on motoring as a means of transport. Collectively, 160 kilometres of motorways, freeways and tolled roads serve the Greater Sydney area and on average, the majority of households rely on at least 1 or 2 cars as a means of transport. However, despite this high reliance on roads, Sydney still maintains the highest rate of usage of public transport in Australia.

The present highway network in Sydney and the rest of New South Wales, Australia was established in August 1928 when the Country Roads Board (the predecessor of the Department of Main Roads and the Roads and Traffic Authority) superseded the 1924 main road classifications and established the basis of the existing New South Wales (NSW) main road system. (the full list of main roads gazetted appears in the NSW Government Gazette of 17 August 1928). The number of a road for administrative purposes is not the same as the route number it carries e.g. the Great Western Highway is Highway 5 for administrative purposes but is signposted as part of route A32.)

Many major routes in New South Wales, including Sydney motorways and even some routes named as "highways" are not officially gazetted as highways. For a list of all numbered routes in New South Wales, see List of road routes in New South Wales.

While highways in many other countries are typically identified by number, highways in Australia, including New South Wales, are known mostly by names. These names typically come from 19th-century explorers, important politicians or geographic regions.

Major motorways and highways serving Greater Sydney include:
 Eastern Distributor
 Southern Cross Drive
 General Holmes Drive
 M5 East Motorway
 M5 South Western Motorway
 Westlink M7
 M2 Hills Motorway
 Lane Cove Tunnel
 Gore Hill Freeway
 Warringah Freeway
 Sydney Harbour Tunnel (or Sydney Harbour Bridge and Cahill Expressway

Cycling 

Cycling in Sydney, New South Wales, Australia takes place for recreation, commuting and as a sport. Sydney has a hilly topography and so may require a slightly higher level of fitness from cyclists than flatter cities such as Melbourne and Canberra. Sydney depends heavily on motor vehicles where traffic and public transport operate at capacity. This means that cyclist are often competing with motorists for limited space on busier roads, and for limited government resources for expenditure on road infrastructure. In its favour, Sydney has a generally mild climate and there are active cycling groups.
For the most part, cyclists ride on the road with motor vehicles (current regulations only permit cyclists under 16 years old to ride on the footpath. Historically, bicycle infrastructure was largely constructed in areas for recreational riding or along shared paths such as in parks. Prior to the involvement of Jan Gehl, the City of Sydney created a Bicycle Action Plan in 2007, part of which involved building physically separated cycleways. In May 2009, the first of these, a 200m stretch along King Street in the CBD opened.

Taxis 

Sydney and the surrounding areas of New South Wales are served by around 6,000 taxis, and the industry employs over 22,700 taxi drivers, the largest number of taxis and drivers in Australia.

In general, individual taxis are owned by small-scale operators who pay membership fees to regional or citywide radio communication networks. These networks provide branding as well as telephone and internet booking services to operators and drivers.

Fares are set by the Independent Pricing and Regulatory Tribunal of New South Wales (IPART). Other aspects of the industry are regulated by the Transport for New South Wales and the Roads & Maritime Services. The industry plays a self-regulating role through the New South Wales Taxi Council.

Vehicle operators are represented by the New South Wales Taxi Industry Association and, in country New South Wales, by the New South Wales Country Operators Association. Drivers are represented by the New South Wales Taxi Drivers Association. The New South Wales Transport Workers Union purports to represent taxi drivers. Most regional centres have a local taxi network.

Airports 

Sydney is primarily served by Sydney Airport, the busiest airport in Australia, serving up to 43 million international and domestic passengers on an annual basis. The airport is located 8 km from Sydney's city centre. An ever growing number of travellers passing through Sydney Airport has ultimately stressed its capacity, and subsequently, investment and construction for the new Western Sydney Airport in Badgerys Creek has taken place.

Additionally, the Greater Sydney region is also served by smaller domestic airports such as Bankstown Airport and Camden Airport which serve short distance and recreational flights from regional areas.

Sydney Public Transport statistics

The average amount of time people spend commuting with public transit in Sydney, for example to and from work, on a weekday is 82 min. 31% of public transit riders, ride for more than 2 hours every day. The average amount of time people wait at a stop or station for public transit is 13 min, while 18% of riders wait for over 20 minutes on average every day. The average distance people usually ride in a single trip with public transit is 9 km, while 21% travel for over 12 km in a single direction.

Patronage

The 2010s have seen major investment in Sydney's public transport infrastructure. The introduction of a metro network and a significant expansion of light rail will lead to a substantial change in the city's modal mix as these projects are completed.

See also
 Taxis in New South Wales

References

External links

NSW TransportInfo – comprehensive information on trains, buses and ferries.
NSW Bike Plan – Bicycle Information for New South Wales